Loxocera is a genus of flies and member of the family Psilidae.

Species
Species within this genus include:

L. achaeta Shatalkin, 1989
L. africana Hennig, 1940
L. albiseta (Schrank, 1803)
L. algerica Villeneuve, 1913
L. aristata (Panzer, 1801)
L. atriceps Bigot, 1886
L. bifida Verbeke, 1968
L. brevibuccata Shatalkin, 1998
L. brevipila Verbeke, 1952
L. brunneifrons Verbeke, 1952
L. burmanica Frey, 1955
L. chinensis Iwasa, 1996
L. collaris Loew, 1870
L. cylindrica Say, 1823
L. decorata Meijere, 1914
L. derivata Shatalkin, 1998
L. dispar Bezzi, 1908
L. femoralis Verbeke, 1952
L. formosana Hennig, 1940
L. freidbergi Shatalkin, 1998
L. fulviventris Meigen, 1826
L. fumipennis Coquillett, 1901
L. ghesquierei Verbeke, 1963
L. ghesquieri Verbeke, 1963
L. glabra Verbeke, 1956
L. glandicula Iwasa, 1993
L. hoffmannseggi Meigen, 1826
L. humeralis Meijere, 1916
L. ichneumonea (Linnaeus, 1758)
L. ignyodactyla Buck, 2006
L. insolita Iwasa, 1996
L. kambaitiensis Frey, 1955
L. laevis Verbeke, 1952
L. lateralis Loew, 1874
L. limpida Shatalkin, 1998
L. lutulenta Iwasa, 1992
L. macrogramma Speiser, 1910
L. maculipennis Hendel, 1913
L. malaisei (Frey, 1955)
L. manifestaria Iwasa, 1993
L. matsumurai Iwasa, 1992
L. michelseni Shatalkin, 1998
L. microps Melander, 1920
L. monstrata Iwasa, 1992
L. nervosa Verbeke, 1952
L. nigrifrons Macquart, 1835
L. ojibwayensis Buck, 2006
L. omei Shatalkin, 1998
L. perstriata Verbeke, 1952
L. pilipleura Verbeke, 1963
L. pisaeus (Rossi, 1794)
L. pleuralis Frey, 1928
L. primigena Shatalkin, 1998
L. rufa Loew, 1874
L. seyrigi Verbeke, 1956
L. sylvatica Meigen, 1826
L. vittipleura Shatalkin, 1998

References

Psilidae
Muscomorph flies of Europe
Articles containing video clips
Taxa named by Johann Wilhelm Meigen
Schizophora genera